The 2022 Kyoto gubernatorial election was held on 10 April 2022 to elect the next governor of , a prefecture of Japan located in the Kansai region of Honshu island. Incumbent Governor Takatoshi Nishiwaki was re-elected for a second term, defeating Ken Kajikawa with 66.81% of the vote.

Candidates 

Takatoshi Nishiwaki, 66, incumbent (since 2018), was supported by the ruling coalition of the LDP and  Komeito, as well as the opposition party CDP and DPFP.
Ken Kajikawa, 62, head of a labor organization, endorsed by JCP.

Results

References 

2022 elections in Japan
Kyoto gubernational elections
Politics of Kyoto Prefecture
April 2022 events in Japan